Dag Inge Ulstein (born 4 December 1980) is a Norwegian politician for the Christian Democratic Party.

Ulstein was appointed Minister of International Development in Solberg's Cabinet on 22 January 2019, a position which he held until the cabinet resigned following the 2021 election.

Career

Early career
Ulstein was a vocalist in the Norwegian Christian pop-group Elevate.

Local politics
Ulstein served as Bergen’s cit commissioner for social, housing and area investment from 2013 to 2014, when his party withdrew from the council cabinet, citing disagreements over a proposed route for the light rail to Åsane. When Harald Schjelderup became chief commissioner following the 2015 local elections, Ulstein was appointed city commissioner for finance. He held the post until he stepped down in 2018.

Minister of International Development
Following his party’s negotiations to enter the Solberg cabinet, Ulstein was appointed minister of international development on 22 January 2019. This was despite the fact that he had supported the Labour favouring faction of the party in the path choice the year before.

Other
Ulstein is leading WHO`s ACT-A Initiative (Access to Covid-19 Tools Accelerator). ACT-A is set up to lead the efforts to mobilize political and financial support to ensure equitable distribution of corona virus vaccines, medicines and tests. He is also a Board Member of the Global Center on Adaptation to address climate change.

Ulstein is deeply committed to International Solidarity and to achieve the Sustainable Development Goals.

He has previously held the position as head of development at Haraldsplass Diaconal Foundation, a specialised hospital. Prior to this position he was the general manager at Haraldsplass therapy and counselling center (2012-2014).

Ulstein was considered one of the most leading candidates to replace Kjell Ingolf Ropstad as party leader after the resigned following a parliamentary housing scandal. Ulstein never confirmed his candidacy, but still pulled himself out of consideration in October 2021, thereby leading to Olaug Bollestad being the presumptive new party leader. He was however open to become deputy leader.

Party deputy leader
Ulstein was designated as first deputy leader along with Bollestad as leader. At the party convention on 13 November, he won with 149 votes against Truls Olufsen-Mehus’ 11.

Other activities
 Asian Infrastructure Investment Bank (AIIB), Ex-Officio Member of the Board of Governors (since 2019)
 Multilateral Investment Guarantee Agency (MIGA), World Bank Group, Ex-Officio Member of the Board of Governors (since 2019)
 World Bank, Ex-Officio Member of the Board of Governors (since 2019)

Personal life
Ulstein is married to Ingjerd Mella and has four children.

References

1980 births
Living people
Norwegian politicians
Christian Democratic Party (Norway) politicians
Ministers of International Development of Norway